Kirsten Stoltmann  is an artist based in Los Angeles.

Stoltmann was born in Milwaukee.  Her art career began in video but has progressed to embrace object-making.  Her work references her Midwestern roots, feminism, sexuality, adolescent culture and self-deprecating humour.

Selected exhibitions

2006

I Know What I'm Doing, Wallspace, New York

Boys and Flowers, Western Bridge, Seattle

Jonathan Vyner/Fortescue Avenue, London

2005

Adjoining the Voids, (in collaboration with Sterling Ruby), Sister Gallery, Los Angeles
 
2004

Imitations of Life, De Balie Cinema, Amsterdam

Renegade, 1R Gallery, Chicago
 
2003

Transference, The Russian Contemporary Art Centers in Ekantrinburg and Kaliningrad

Art Video Lounge, (curated by Chrissie Isles), Art Basel Miami Beach

Behind The Pedestal, (in collaboration with Sterling Ruby), Bower Gallery, San Antonio

Dinner and A Movie: Women in the Director's Chair, Chicago
 
2001

Art/Music: Rock, Pop, Techno, the Museum of Contemporary Art, Sydney

2000

Pretend TV, La Panaderia, Mexico City

References

External links
Further information from Wallspace Gallery
Images, biography and texts from the Saatchi Gallery
Further information from Donald Young Gallery
Carol Jackson, Kirsten Stoltmann at Donald Young Gallery, Frieze.com

Living people
1968 births
Artists from Milwaukee
Artists from Los Angeles